Islington Studios, often known as Gainsborough Studios, were a British film studio located on the south bank of the Regent's Canal, in Poole Street, Hoxton in the former Metropolitan Borough of Shoreditch, London between 1919 and 1949. The studios are closely associated with Gainsborough Pictures which was based there for most of the studio's history. During its existence Islington worked closely with its sister Lime Grove Studios in Shepherd's Bush and many films were made partly at one studio and partly at the other. Amongst the films made at the studios were Alfred Hitchcock thrillers, Will Hay comedies and Gainsborough Melodramas.

History
The studios were originally built as a power station for the Great Northern & City Railway, and were acquired by the major American company Famous Players-Lasky which wanted to set up a British subsidiary. The building was converted into a two-stage studio, and production began in 1920. During this era Alfred Hitchcock made his start in films, when he was employed as an intertitle writer at Islington. In 1924 the Hollywood company sold off the studios which were bought by Michael Balcon's Gainsborough Pictures. The company enjoyed some success turning out silent films during the 1920s, at a time when other British companies were struggling.

In the late 1920s Gainsborough merged with the larger British Gaumont which owned the Lime Grove Studios. The conglomerate had ambitious plans to challenge Hollywood and produce more than twenty films a year. The larger Lime Grove complex was selected to make expensive films while Islington was designated the cheaper films, particularly comedies. However, during these years it served as an overflow studio and many films scheduled for Shepherd's Bush were made partly at Islington.

During the Slump of 1937, British Gaumont shut down production. Although it considered giving up filmmaking completely, it was decided to continue Gainsborough Pictures making slightly cheaper films. Shepherd's Bush was shut down and all production switched to Islington. The success of some of these late 1930s Islington productions such as The Lady Vanishes helped Gainsborough to keep in business.

Unlike many other studios, Islington was not requisitioned when war broke out and production continued there, but the studio was temporarily closed because it was feared that a direct hit from a German bomb during an air raid would make the large chimney collapse. All production was switched to re-opened Lime Grove. Both studios came under the control of the Rank Organisation when it bought Gainsborough in 1941.

Following the war, Islington were re-opened. In 1946 Betty Box was placed in charge of the studios when her brother Sydney Box was appointed by Rank to run Gainsborough Pictures. Over the next three years the studio turned out a large number of thrillers and comedies. In 1949 both Islington and Shepherd's Bush were closed when Rank concentrated production at Pinewood Studios. Today a block of flats stand where the studio used to be. The block's courtyard features a large sculpture of Alfred Hitchcock's head, by sculptor Anthony Donaldson.

See also
 List of Gainsborough Pictures films

References

Bibliography
 Macnab, Geoffrey. J. Arthur Rank and the British Film Industry. Routledge, 1994.
 Murphy, Robert. Realism and Tinsel: Cinema and Society in Britain, 1939–1949. Routledge, 1992.
 Warren, Patricia. British Film Studios: An Illustrated History. Batsford, 2001.

External links
London’s Hollywood: The Gainsborough Film Studio’s Silent Years article at Brenton Film

British film studios
Buildings and structures in the London Borough of Hackney